Christopher Dore is an Australian journalist who was the editor-in-chief of The Australian from October 2018 until 16 November 2022. He was formerly the editor of The Daily Telegraph, The Courier-Mail, The Sunday Times, and deputy editor of The Sunday Telegraph and The Australian.

Dore was replaced as editor-in-chief at The Australian by Michelle Gunn.

Dore was born in Brisbane, Queensland, and studied economics and politics at the University of Adelaide. He began his career at The Australian, where he held several roles, including deputy editor, Victorian editor, night editor, New Zealand-based Pacific correspondent, and political correspondent in the Canberra Press Gallery.

References

External links
 The Australian’s editor Chris Dore lost his job after attending News Corp event in California
 Crikey’s Peter Fray apologises over Walkleys outburst as speculation surrounds Chris Dore’s News Corp exit

Australian newspaper editors
People from Brisbane
Living people
Year of birth missing (living people)
The Australian journalists